Bonne of Bourbon (1341 – 19 January 1402) was a Countess of Savoy by marriage to Amadeus VI of Savoy. She served as regent of Savoy during the absence of her spouse from 1366 to 1367, with her son in 1383, and finally during the minority of her grandson Amadeus VIII, Duke of Savoy in 1391–1395.

Biography
Bonne was the daughter of Peter I, Duke of Bourbon, and Isabella of Valois. She was engaged to Amadeus VI, Count of Savoy as part of the Treaty of Paris (1355), which included a dowry of three thousand florins per year.  She married Amadeus in September 1355 in Paris.  Immediately after their wedding, her husband had to return to his army, still engaged in the Hundred Years' War.

First regency
In 1366, when her husband left on a crusade to Bulgaria, he named her as regent of Savoy for the duration of his absence, to be advised by his council.  In 1367, James, lord of Piedmont, a cousin of Amadeus, died.  There was a dispute over his inheritance between his eldest son, Philip and his widow, Margaret of Beaujeu, representing the interests of her young sons, Amadeus and Louis.  Bonne, acting as regent, was only able to keep them from open war.  She was not able to settle the dispute, and Philip had to go to Amadeus in Venice to try to get resolution.

She greatly enjoyed the Alpine mountain lakes of Savoy, and tried to ensure the castles she stayed in had good views of them.  In 1371, she oversaw the building of the chateau at Ripaille, seeking to build a manor that would more easily accommodate the larger court of the Count.  The new chateau had large windows overlooking Lake Geneva.  She was a great patron of music, and was known for her skill on the harp.

In July 1382, funds were running low for her husband's ongoing wars in Italy, so she sold some of her jewelry for more than 400 florins to help him re-equip.

Second regency
In 1383, when her husband, Amadeus VI, died, he left a will granting his wife power over the government of Savoy despite their son, Amadeus VII, being in his early twenties. With the support of the Council, led by Louis de Cossonay and composed of several of her allies, such as Otton de Grandson, Bonne governed Savoy in her son's name. According to Max Bruchet, one of the fears of the Council in those days was the growing influence of French princes over Savoy: the Duke of Berry had married his daughter to Amadeus VII and his grandson, Amadeus VIII, would one day rule Savoy. The young Amadeus was also betrothed to Mary, the daughter of Philip II, the Duke of Burgundy. Both princes had been younger brothers of Charles V, the King of France, and were now acting as regents for their nephew, Charles VI.

Third regency
When Amadeus VII died of tetanus in 1391, and Bonne became regent. Her influence over Savoy came to an end when Amadeus VII's doctor (widely seen to have been responsible for the Count's death) accused the Countess of ordering her son's death in 1395. The Dukes of Berry and Burgundy also accused several members of the Count's Council of being complicit in the murder and Bonne was relieved of the regency and of caring for her grandson, the new Count Amadeus VIII.

Bonne died at the Château de Mâcon.

Issue
She and Amadeus had three children:
A daughter, born 1358, who  died after a few weeks
Amadeus VII of Savoy (March 1360 – November 1, 1391). He married Bonne of Berry (1365–1435), daughter of Duke John of Berry and a niece of Bonne of Bourbon.
Louis of Savoy, born late 1364, died before the end of the year

Ancestry

References

Sources

1341 births
1402 deaths
House of Bourbon (France)
Countesses of Savoy
14th-century women rulers
14th-century people from Savoy
14th-century French women
15th-century French people
15th-century French women